Disintermediation is the removal of intermediaries in economics from a supply chain, or "cutting out the middlemen" in connection with a transaction or a series of transactions. Instead of going through traditional distribution channels, which had some type of intermediary (such as a distributor, wholesaler, broker, or agent), companies may now deal with customers directly, for example via the Internet.

Disintermediation may decrease the total cost of servicing customers and may allow the manufacturer to increase profit margins and/or reduce prices. Disintermediation initiated by consumers is often the result of high market transparency, in that buyers are aware of supply prices direct from the manufacturer. Buyers may choose to bypass the middlemen (wholesalers and retailers) to buy directly from the manufacturer, and pay less. Buyers can alternatively elect to purchase from wholesalers. Often, a business-to-consumer electronic commerce (B2C) company functions as the bridge between buyer and manufacturer.

However manufacturers will still incur distribution costs, such as the physical transport of goods, packaging in small units, advertising, and customer helplines, some or all of which would previously have been borne by the intermediary.  To illustrate, a typical B2C supply chain is composed of four or five entities. These are the supplier, manufacturer, wholesaler, retailer and buyer.

History

The term was originally applied to the banking industry in 1967; disintermediation occurred when consumers avoided the  intermediation of banks by investing directly in securities (government and private bonds, insurance companies, hedge funds, mutual funds and stocks) rather than leaving their money in savings accounts. The original cause was a U.S. government regulation (Regulation Q) which limited the interest rate paid on interest bearing accounts that were insured by the Federal Deposit Insurance Corporation.

It was later applied more generally to "cutting out the middleman" in commerce, though the financial meaning remained predominant. Only in the late 1990s did it become widely popularized.

Impact of Internet-related disintermediation upon various industries
It has been argued that the Internet modifies the supply chain due to market transparency.  Disintermediation has acquired a new meaning with the advent of the virtual marketplace.  The virtual marketplace sellers like Amazon are edging out the middlemen. Direct sellers and buyers connect with each other because of the platform created by the virtual marketplace vendor. There is quid pro quo for the vendor for the use of the platform, else it would make no business sense to create such a platform.  If the buyer, having connected with the seller, circumvents the platform and talks to the seller and does her deal directly with the seller, then the platform owner is unlikely to get her revenue share.  This may be considered a new form of disintermediation.

Discussion
In the non-Internet world, disintermediation has been an important strategy for many big box retailers like Walmart, which attempt to reduce prices by reducing the number of intermediaries between the supplier and the buyer. Disintermediation is also closely associated with the idea of just in time manufacturing, as the removal of the need for inventory removes one function of an intermediary.  The existence of laws which discourage disintermediation has been cited as a reason for the poor economic performance of Japan and Germany in the 1990s.

However, Internet-related disintermediation occurred less frequently than many expected during the dot com boom. Retailers and wholesalers provide essential functions such as the extension of credit, aggregation of products from different suppliers, and processing of returns. In addition, shipping goods to and from the manufacturer can in many cases be far less efficient than shipping them to a store where the consumer can pick them up (if the consumer's trip to the store is ignored). In response to the threat of disintermediation, some retailers have attempted to integrate a virtual presence and a physical presence in a strategy known as bricks and clicks.

Reintermediation

Reintermediation can be defined as the reintroduction of an intermediary between end users (consumers) and a producer. This term applies especially to instances in which disintermediation has occurred first.

At the start of the Internet revolution, electronic commerce was seen as a tool of disintermediation for cutting operating costs. The concept was that by allowing consumers to purchase products directly from producers via the Internet, the product delivery chain would be drastically shortened, thereby "disintermediating" the standard supply model middlemen. However, what largely happened was that new intermediaries appeared in the digital landscape (e.g., Amazon.com and eBay).

Reintermediation occurred due to many new problems associated with the e-commerce disintermediation concept, largely centered on the issues associated with the direct-to-consumers model. The high cost of shipping many small orders, massive customer service issues, and confronting the wrath of disintermediated retailers and supply channel partners all presented real obstacles. Huge resources are required to accommodate presales and postsales issues of individual consumers. Before disintermediation, supply chain middlemen acted as salespeople for the producers. Without them, the producer itself would have to handle procuring those customers. Selling online has its own associated costs: developing quality websites, maintaining product information, and marketing expenses all add up. Finally, limiting a product's availability to Internet channels forces the producer to compete with the rest of the Internet for customers' attention, a space that is becoming increasingly crowded.

Examples
Notable examples of disintermediation include Dell and Apple, which sell many of their systems direct-to-consumer—thus bypassing traditional retail chains, having succeeded in creating brands well recognized by customers, profitable and with continuous growth.

In the automotive industry 
Tesla avoids using dealers as middlemen by offering their own outlets, which have only a few vehicles for display and test driving; customers complete their full purchase online. This approach allowed Tesla to raise auto gross profit by about 34%. This strategy also allows Tesla to control more of its customers' experience and build online community. Following Tesla's success, two other automotive brands, Audi and General Motors, decided to start trials of direct sales in 2012 and 2013 respectively.

See also

Flat fee MLS — An example of disintermediation in the Real Estate industry.
Laiki agora - an example of disintermediation of agricultural foodstuffs in Greece
Outlet store
Social peer-to-peer processes
Direct-to-consumer

References 
'Notes

Bibliography
Graham, Mark.  "Warped Geographies of Development: The Internet and Theories of Economic Development." Geography Compass, (2) 2008.
Hawken, Paul.  "Disintermediation: an economics buzzword that neatly explains a lot of the good that is going on." CoEvolution Quarterly, Spring 1981, pp. 6–14.

Business models
E-commerce
Distribution (marketing)
Supply chain management